The Men's moguls competition at the FIS Freestyle Ski and Snowboarding World Championships 2023 was held on 25 February 2023.

Qualification
The qualification was started at 11:45. The best 18 skiers qualified for the final.

Final

References

Men's moguls